Origami Warriors (Taiwanese translation: Origami Fighters) is a Taiwanese comic book created by Jhou Sian Zong and published by the Ching Win Company. The comic was published in a series of 22 books and followed in 2003 by Origami Fighter Generation, Origami Fighter W, and Origami Fighter X.

An animated adaptation, with significant differences, was created by a Korean studio. Reminiscent of 2000's "monster collecting" anime, including a cast akin to the archetypes that would appear in said shows. An English dub for the adaptation was later made by Vitello Productions, and featured voice actors notable for roles in American cartoons. The dub, however, was scarcely distributed.

Plot 
Origami Fighters opens when Xiao-Jie and two other children come across several pieces of paper and a book showing ways to fold them into different shapes. The material turns out to be an ancient hi-tech gadget that, when folded properly, turns into a Genie. By further contract with the Genies, the folders could transform themselves into superhumans known as "Origami Fighters".

Characters

Main characters 
Wang Jhih-Jie (王志哲, ワン・ジージェ Wan Jīje) / Rico
 Voiced by: Wang Ji-Cheol (Korean), Rob Paulsen (English), Sōichiro Hoshi (Japanese)
His nickname is Xiao-Jie (小哲). Xiao is the name of a flute and is a surname relating to "junior", while Jie means "philosophy".
 Origami Fighter species: Dragon
 Elemental power: Fire and Negative Energy (learned at the very end of the series)
 Fighter's special skill: Instant acceleration
 Transformation: Sky Dragon
The main protagonist. He is called "Yamato" in the Japanese version.

Zeng Li-Lian (曾麗蓮, ゼン・リーリャン Zen Rīrian) / Jasmine
 Voiced by: Jeong Yeo-Rin (Korean), Kath Soucie (English)
Her nickname is Xiao-Lian (小蓮), meaning "lotus". She is also called "Jasmine".
 Origami Fighter species: Flower
 Elemental power: Wood
 Fighter's special skill: cures physical wounds.
 Transformation: Lotus Fairy
One of Xiao-Jie's sidekicks.

Su, Dai-Jhih  (蘇代止, スー・タイジ Sū Daiji) / Atticus
 Voiced by: Seo Dae-Jin (Korean), Cam Clarke (English)
His nickname is Shu-Dai-Zih (書呆子, in Japanese: マジメくん Madzumekun), a homonym of "bookworm". He is also called "Lingling".
 Origami Fighter Species: Crane
 Elemental power: Wind
 Fighter special skill: Flight and enables others to fly.
 Transformation: Eagle
A smart and geeky classmate of Ji Cheol. He has good memory without any fault. He is observative, likes exploring and has a habit of noting everything. He is famous among his friends and stays cool at times. He controls the Origami beasts in contract with Ling Ling, the spirit of the crane.

Other characters 

Bi Jhih (畢直, ブルタンク Burutanku) / Korean: Toongi (퉁이)
 His nickname is Pi-Zih (痞子), meaning "ruffian".
Rather mysterious character. He likes Jeong, Yeo Lin and sometimes interferes. He has a mercenary spirit and tends to value money more than friendship. He is known as the professional among the titular Origami Warriors, since he is skillful in machine manufacturing and construction. He can also make many vehicles with origami paper. In the manga, he initially had no ability to call the spirits, but in the later chapters, he obtained a golden dragon Genie.

Da-Kr (達克, ダーキー Dākī) / Hyeon, Dal-Kook (현달국, 玄達國)
 His name is a transcription of the word "dark".
A student of professor Wang, who leads the children their way to get to know the origami civilization. He has the special ability to transform himself into very a handsome man or a tough guy, and is a mysterious figure who lives in a luxurious apartment. He has a contract with Paoran, the spirit of the Wolf by himself, and controls the origami beasts.

Kuang Long (狂龍, マシュー・クァン Mashū Kuan) / Kwang Yong (광룡, 狂龍)
 His name means "wild dragon".
A mysterious boy who appears suddenly when the heroes are in trouble and leaves afterward. He seems to be related to the gang of evil that tries to uncover the origami secret and seems to have special relation with Ji Cheol. He controls the origami beasts under contract with Huolong, a black dragon.

Animated adaptation 
An animated television series based on the comic book was produced by Dong Woo Animation and debuted in Taiwan in 2004. It aired in Japan on TV Tokyo in 2005; and in 2006, it became the first Taiwanese cartoon shown on South Korean television when it premiered on SBS. The staff include animators from Hong Kong, Japan and South Korea.

Beside borrowing the idea of origami from the comic series, the story and characters of the animation series are greatly altered. Instead of combining with their Genies to become Origami Warriors, the characters simply summon their Genies.  Also, instead of the various adventures and the results of world war in the original series, the characters are all competitors of the "Origami Combat Competition". The character designs are also more contemporary of 2000's anime rather than the manhua's style, reminiscient of 1980's manga. The series is also less violent than the original source material.

The first episode was dubbed into English in 2008 by Vitello Productions as a sales pilot, which localized character names, had new music and featured the voices of Rob Paulsen, Kath Soucie and Cam Clarke. This English dubbed episode was available on Toon Goggles, until 2017.

Staff 
 Original work: "Origami Warriors" by Jhou Sian-Zong (周顯宗)
 Production: Origami Warriors Committee
 Setting: Jo Jang Hee/Junki Takegami
 Brochure: Kim Eon Jeong/Yasuo Shizuya, Sakachi Ohashi, Takashi Yamada, Tadashi Hayakawa
 Character design: Wi Hyeon Soo/Hiroyuki Taiga, Matsushita Hiromi/Kazuko Tadano
 Artwork: Jang Yoon cheol/Katsuhiro Hashi
 Color design: Lee Seon ho/Rumiko Nagai
 Technical director: Nam Goong jin
 Marketing: Han Jeong Hoon, Kim Eun Joo, Bak Chung Seok, Kook Yeong Ja
 Advertising: Bae Seon Yeong
 Web-based creators: Yoon Joon yeong/Jeong In Soo
 Design: Song Cheong Hwa/Moon Se Rim
 Creative producers: Lee Kyeong Sook/Kim Jae Young/Kwon Yeong Sook
 Producers: Kwon Ho Jin/Seong Ha Mook/No Jeong Hyeon
 Animation production: Hong Jemina/Kang Seok Woo, Kim Jeong Kyoo/An Yoo Seop
 Directors: Park Woo Hyun/Ami Tomobuki

Music 
The opening and ending themes are performed by TVXQ.

"Free your mind"
Song composer: Kim Yeong Hoo
Music composer: Kim Yeong Hoo/William Pyeon
Lab creation: Brian Joo
Vocals: TVXQ

"Your LOVE is all I need"
Song composer: Steven "SJ" Lee
Music composer: JoJo Bee
Vocals: DBSK

Reception 
Origami Warriors won the 2002 award for most popular children's comic from the Chinese Publishers' Foundation and the Comic Artist Labor Union in Taipei.

References 

Fiction about origami
Superhero comics
Taiwanese comics titles
2000s South Korean animated television series